Petra Andersson (born 23 October 1993) is a Swedish football midfielder who played for Eskilstuna United DFF.

Awards and honours 
Sweden U19
Winner
 UEFA Women's Under-19 Championship: 2012

External links 
 

1993 births
Living people
Swedish women's footballers
AIK Fotboll (women) players
Eskilstuna United DFF players
Damallsvenskan players
Women's association football midfielders